= Asador Bastian =

Restaurant in Chicago, Illinois, U.S.

- Interactive map of Asador Bastian

Restaurant information
- Location: 214 West Erie Street, Chicago, Illinois, 60654, United States
- Coordinates: 41°53′39″N 87°38′05″W

Asador Bastian is a restaurant in Chicago, Illinois. It was included in The New York Times's 2024 list of the 50 best restaurants in the United States.
